Ayaş is a Mediterranean coastal town in Mersin Province, Turkey.

Geography 
Ayaş is a part of Erdemli district, which is a part of Mersin Province. The population is 2269 as of 2019. The town is situated at the coast and there are two beaches of touristic potential, Yemişkumu and Merdivenkuyu.

History 

Ayaş had been inhabited since the ancient ages. Ancient Ayas was an island named Elaiussa and a town on the shore facing the island named Sebaste. Archelaus of Cappadocia had a palace in Elaiussa. But the island had since been joined the mainland because of alivion accumulation. During middle age, Elaiussa Sebaste lost its former importance. After the 12th century, the ruins of the former town became a battle ground between the Armenian Kingdom of Cilicia and the Karamanids. The area around the former town was incorporated into Ottoman Empire in the 15th century and it became the grazing area of a nomadic Turkmen tribe named Ayaş. A part of the tribe settled in the village named after Ayaş and, in 1989, it was incorporated into Kumkuyu municipality on the east. In 1999, Ayaş was declared a town and issued from Kumkuyu municipality.

Economy 

Like most towns around, Ayaş economy depends on vegetable agriculture. Tourism has begun to play a role in the town's economy and there are hotels, beaches and summer houses.

See also
Kanlıdivane
Çanakçı rock tombs

References 

Populated places in Mersin Province
Populated coastal places in Turkey
Seaside resorts in Turkey
Towns in Turkey
Tourist attractions in Mersin Province
Populated places in Erdemli District